is a retired Japanese volleyball player.

She was part of the Japan women's national volleyball team at the 1994 FIVB Volleyball Women's World Championship in Brazil. On club level she played with Hitachi.

Clubs
 Hitachi (1994)

References

1974 births
Living people
Japanese women's volleyball players
Place of birth missing (living people)